Far South Egans Wilderness is a protected wilderness area on the southern end of the Egan Range in the U.S. state of Nevada.  Established in 2004 by the U.S. Congress, the area is managed by the U.S. Bureau of Land Management. This mountain wilderness rises from 5,800 feet (1767 m) to 9,823 feet (2994 m) to form stunning  multi-colored limestone cliffs. Wildlife in the area includes mule deer, elk, desert bighorn sheep, mountain lions, golden eagles and ferruginous hawks that live among the rare mix of ponderosa pine and ancient bristlecone pine groves in the higher elevations of the mountains.

See also
List of U.S. Wilderness Areas

References

External links
Far South Egans Wilderness - Friends of Nevada Wilderness

IUCN Category Ib
Wilderness areas of Nevada
Protected areas of Lincoln County, Nevada
Protected areas established in 2004
2004 establishments in Nevada